Nevus spilus, also known as speckled lentiginous nevus, is a light brown or tan birth mark, speckled with small, dark spots or small bumps. If it occurs in a segmental pattern then it is sometimes referred to as a Zosteriform speckled lentiginous nevus. 

It may be associated with types of phakomatosis pigmentovascularis.

Prevalence is between 0.2% and 2.8%.

See also 
 Phakomatosis pigmentokeratotica
 Skin lesion
 List of cutaneous conditions

References

External links 

Melanocytic nevi and neoplasms